Windy Gyle is a mountain in the Cheviot Hills range, on the border between England and Scotland. Like the other hills in the area, it is rounded and grass-covered. It is the highest summit on the border, although not the highest point as the border is higher where it runs along the western shoulder of The Cheviot, at a point called Cairn Hill West Top, or Hangingstone Hill.  The cairn at the summit of this hill is named Russell's Cairn and has a small depression suitable for shielding about 15 people from the wind; the border runs directly through the cairn although this can only be seen on the map, the fence which follows it in many places is absent here. The Pennine Way crosses the summit, thus providing one possible route of ascent. Windy Gyle may also be climbed from the Coquet valley to the south (England), or from Cocklawfoot to the north (Scotland). There are good views from the summit north towards the Scottish Borders, Eildon Hills and Edinburgh and south across the southern Cheviot Hills to the North Pennines.

See also
 Anglo-Scottish border

References

Cheviot Hills
Donald mountains
Hewitts of England
Hills of Northumberland
Mountains and hills of the Scottish Borders
Nuttalls
Anglo-Scottish border
Alwinton